Christian Ludwig Boxberg (Sondershausen 24 April 1670Görlitz 1 December 1729) was a German composer and organist.

From 1692 to 1700 Boxberg was active as an opera composer. His operas were performed in Leipzig, Wolfenbüttel, Kassel and Ansbach. From 1702 to 1729 he was Kapellmeister at the Church of St. Peter and Paul in Görlitz.

Works
Operas:
 Orion
 Die verschwiegene Treue
 Sardanapalus (1698)

Cantatas:
 Herr, tue meine Lippen auf
 Machet die Tore weit

Recordings
 Cantata "Bestelle dein Haus" on Trauerkantaten. Reyghere, Bowman, Mey, Egmond, Ricercar Consort. Ricercar.
Boxberg: Sardanapalus (Oper in deutscher Sprache 1698) United Continuo Ensemble directed Jorg Meder, Pan Classics 2014

References

1670 births
1729 deaths
18th-century classical composers
German Baroque composers
German classical composers
German male classical composers
18th-century German composers
18th-century German male musicians